Avinash Trivedi is an Indian politician and a member of 17th Legislative Assembly, Uttar Pradesh of India. He represents the ‘Bakshi Ka Talab’ constituency in Lucknow district of Uttar Pradesh.

Political career
Avinash Trivedi contested Uttar Pradesh Assembly Election as Bhartiya Janata Party candidate and defeated his close contestant Nakul Dubey from Bahujan Samaj Party with a margin of 17,584 votes.

Posts held

References

Politicians from Lucknow
Bharatiya Janata Party politicians from Uttar Pradesh
Uttar Pradesh MLAs 2017–2022
Living people
Year of birth missing (living people)